Helenium is a genus of annuals and herbaceous perennial plants in the family Asteraceae, native to the Americas.

They bear yellow or orange daisy-like composite flowers. A number of these species (particularly Helenium autumnale) have the common name sneezeweed, based on the former use of their dried leaves in making snuff. It was inhaled to cause sneezing that would supposedly rid the body of evil spirits.

The genus is named for Helen of Troy, daughter of Zeus and Leda.

Helenium species are used as food plants by the larvae of some Lepidoptera species including Phymatopus behrensii.

Genus level properties: most conspicuously globe-like disk-shaped flowers, rays three-lobed at tip.

Species

Cultivation

Numerous cultivars have been developed for garden use - mainly from H. autumnale and H. bigelovii. They are useful for late summer and fall bloom, usually in less formal compositions. They are appropriate for native gardens in areas where they are indigenous, and they look wonderfully in bouquets. Annual species are easily grown from seed, and perennials should be divided every year in order to retain their vigor. The soil should be fertile with a generous amount of organic manner in the form of compost, manure or other decayed organic matter in addition to, perhaps, an application of a complete fertilizer in spring. Heleniums should be grown in full sun average to moist soil with good drainage. They are drought tolerant, but should be watered on planting and regularly until established.

AGM cultivars
The following have gained the Royal Horticultural Society's Award of Garden Merit:- 
 
 'Baudirektor Linne' 
 'Blütentisch' 
 'Butterpat' 
 'Dunkle Pracht'  
 'Feuersiegel' 
 'Gartensonne' 
 'Karneol' 
 'Moerheim Beauty' 
 'Ring of Fire' 
 'Rubinzwerg' 
 'Sahin's Early Flowerer' 
 'Waltraut' 
 'Wesergold' 
 

The UK National Collection of heleniums is located at Yew Tree House, Hall Lane, Hankelow. near Audlem in Cheshire.

References

Bibliography

  
 

 
Asteraceae genera